Secrets of the Nile is a Nancy Drew and Hardy Boys Supermystery crossover novel, published in 1995.

The Hardys, Nancy Drew, and her friend Bess Marvin, are posing as newlyweds in Egypt. The Hardys are on the trail of a banker who is being targeted by a band of radicals, while Nancy and Bess are trying to protect the daughter of a friend from her enraged ex-husband. Facing deception, treachery, violence, and vendettas, they must become allies and unmask the truth behind the confusion and chaos. In another plot twist, Frank and Nancy kiss on the balcony after the case is finished, although both feel as if it was a mistake. Nancy says that she is in love with Ned and Frank is in love with Callie.

Adaptation 
The 26th installment in the Nancy Drew point-and-click adventure game series by Her Interactive, named Nancy Drew: Tomb of the Lost Queen, is loosely based on the novel.

References

External links
Secrets of the Nile at Fantastic Fiction
Supermystery series books

Supermystery
1995 American novels
1995 children's books
Novels set in Egypt
Novels adapted into video games